Narovchatsky District is an administrative and municipal district (raion), one of the twenty-seven in Penza Oblast, Russia. It is located in the northwest of the oblast. Its administrative center is the rural locality (a selo) of Narovchat. Population: 12,069 (2010 Census);  The population of Narovchat accounts for 34.8% of the district's total population.

References

Notes

Sources

 
Districts of Penza Oblast